Archbishop Paisi (secular name Pashko Vodica; 1881 – 4 March 1966) was the Primate of the Orthodox Autocephalous Church of Albania from 1949 to 1966. He succeeded Archbishop Kristofor and was succeeded by Archbishop Damian.

He was the father of Josif Pashko, a high ranking communist leader.

Life
Pashko Vodica was born in the village of Vodicë, Kolonjë region in southern Albania, back then Ottoman Empire. He attended primary school in his hometown, but did not complete it. In 1910, the now-married Pashko ordained. In 1912 he was arrested by the Ottoman authorities because of his activities for the Albanian national movement. In 1920 he received the dignity of Archimandrite - his wife was now deceased. Two years later he was part of the Orthodox Congress of Berat that the Orthodox Autocephalous Church of Albania declared Autocephaly.

Pashko joined the National Liberation Front during World War II fighting along the Communist forces. On April 18, 1948 Archimandrite Pashko ordained bishop of Korçë by Archbishop Christopher (Kisi) with Russian Orthodox Bishop Nestor (Sidoruk) (1904-1951).

He had the strong support of Communist authorities in succeeding Kisi in 1949, never disappointing them, even though because of his marriage he was not eligible for being elected. He openly showed his communist affiliation in his telegrams sent to Enver Hoxha and to Alexius, Patriate of Moscow and all Russia. The appointment of Paisi was followed by the formation of a new Holy Synod comprising Pais, Bishop of Tirane, Durres, and all Albania, Kiril Naslazi, bishop of Berat, Fillothe Duni, bishop of Korce, Damian Kokoneshi, bishop of Gjirokaster, and Suffragan bishop Sofron Borova.
Paisi visited the USSR twice. By early 60', the pressure on the church was accelerating, though Paisi never stood against the authorities.

References

20th-century Albanian clergy
20th-century Eastern Orthodox bishops
Albanian religious leaders
Eastern Orthodox Christians from Albania
Primates of the Albanian Orthodox Church
1881 births
1966 deaths
People from Kolonjë